Dirk Else (born 27 August 1977 in Erlabrunn, GDR) is a retired German ski jumper.

In the World Cup he finished once among the top 15, a twelfth place from Zakopane in January 2002 being his best result. He won the overall Continental Cup in the 1999/00 season.

External links

1977 births
Living people
People from Erzgebirgskreis
German male ski jumpers
Sportspeople from Saxony